"Somewhere in My Past" is a 1985 song composed by Mon del Rosario and recorded by Filipino singer-actress Julie Vega. The song is the debut single of Julie Vega and later served as the lead single of Vega's debut album "First Love" released under Emerald Recording Company.

Awards and nominations
Song of the Year Nominee at the 1985 Awit Awards.

Cover versions
 Mon del Rosario and a duet with Cookie Chua recorded the song for his 1999 album of the same name.
 Glydel Mercado recorded the song for her 2002 self-titled studio album.
 In 2004, singer Divo Bayer recorded the song for his debut album A Better Me.
 In 2012, singer Angeline Quinto performed the song on ASAP 2012.
 In 2020, singer Erik Santos performed the song on ASAP Natin 'To.
 In 2021, singer Janella Salvador performed the song on ASAP Natin 'To and her new album Melody of Love.

References

1985 songs